Taken: The Search for Sophie Parker is a 2013 American made-for-television film directed by Don Michael Paul and stars Julie Benz, Amy Bailey and Naomi Battrick. The film borrowed the themes and similarities in the Taken franchise, particularly Taken and Taken 2. It premiered on September 21, 2013, on Lifetime.

Premise
After her daughter is abducted in Russia, an NYPD detective goes out to find and save her from the kidnappers.

Cast
 Julie Benz as Lieutenant Stevie Parker 
 Amy Bailey as Nadia Petrova
 Jeffrey Meek as Jimmy Devlin 
 Naomi Battrick as Sophie Parker 
 Jemma Dallender as Janie Hillman 
 Andrew Byron as Mikhail Semyonov
 Matvey Borushko as Bobby 
 Valentin Ganev as Chief Anton Mirov 
 Alastair Mackenzie as Ambassador Richard Hillman
 Velislav Pavlov as Ramazin Sultanov / Mr. Red
 Marina Kiskinova as French Girl
 Elena Boeva as U.S. Envoy
 Vladimir Kolev as Russian Cop
 Vlado Mihailov as Russian Hacker
 Yordanko Bojankov as Bouncer # 1
 Emilia Klayn as CNN Anchorwoman
 Raicho Vasilev as Bouncer # 2
 Atanas Srebrev as FBI Agent
 Tim Mudd as Prince Umberto 
 Asdis Run as Princess Maria Umberto
 Kalina Stoimenova as Kidnapped Girl

References

External links
 

2013 television films
2013 films
2013 action thriller films
American action thriller films
Films set in New York City
Films set in Russia
Films set in Moscow
Films shot in Bulgaria
Lifetime (TV network) films
Films directed by Don Michael Paul
Films scored by Frederik Wiedmann
Films about kidnapping
Films about human trafficking
Taken (franchise)
2010s English-language films
2010s American films